Villafruela is a municipality located in the province of Burgos, Castile and León, Spain. According to the INE, as of January 2022, the municipality has a population of 154 inhabitants.

Of architectural importance in the town are the church of San Lorenzo, the Archbishop's Palace, currently in disarray, and a stone arch known as the "Arco de Odón" which is part of the medieval defensive walls of the town.

Gabino Ramos, philologist and co-author of the Diccionario del español actual, was born in Villafruela.

References

Municipalities in the Province of Burgos